Funder is a surname. Notable people with the surname include:

Anna Funder (born 1966), Australian writer
David C. Funder, American psychologist
John Funder (born 1940), Australian medical researcher
Kathleen Funder (1941 – 1998), Australian psychologist

See also
Fund (disambiguation)